Myriopholis narirostris is a species of snake in the family Leptotyphlopidae.

References

Myriopholis
Reptiles described in 1867
Taxa named by Wilhelm Peters